Route 620 is a  long mostly north–south secondary highway in the eastern portion of New Brunswick, Canada.

The route starts at Route 107 in Stanley where it travels southwest across the Nashwaak River to Limekiln.  In Boyds Corner, the route turns south to run through Tay Creek, Tay Mills, Cardigan, and Hamtown Corner. From here, the route travels past Hurlett, Carleton Lake, and Estey's Bridge. Continuing, the route travels through Royal Road and over the Nashwaak River before running on the east bank. It breaks away from the Nashwaak River as it enters Fredericton, where it is known as Royal Road. It ends at Route 105.

History

See also

References

620
620